Tępa Podkowa is a Polish Coat of Arms. It was used by several szlachta families in the times of the Polish–Lithuanian Commonwealth.

The name literally means "Dull Horseshoe".

History

Blazon
The blazon can be translated as:
On a blue field an upright standing horseshoe with a golden cross in the center. Blue mantling with silver and gold. In the crown a black wing.

Notable bearers
The fictional characters of the knights Zbyszko of Bogdaniec and Maćko of Bogdaniec, the main characters in Henryk Sienkiewicz's The Teutonic Knights, are bearers of this Coat of Arms.

External links

See also
 Polish heraldry
 Heraldry
 Coat of Arms

Polish coats of arms